Paulos Tesfagiorgis is an Eritrean human rights activist. Fought for his people by establishing the only PFDJ licensed Regional Centre for Human Rights and Development in Eritrea. (The People's Front for Democracy and Justice) Tesfagiorgis was also co-founder and head of the Eritrean Relief Association  during the Eritrean war of independence.

Early career after independence 

During the Eritrean war of independence Paulos Tesfagiorgis was the head of the Eritrean Relief Association, coordinating international aid for Eritreans, particularly during the 1983–1985 famine in Ethiopia. Following Eritrean independence Tesfagiorgis was appointed to the commission which drafted Eritrea's constitution. The constitution was ratified in 1997. In 2002 Tesfagiorgis and 17 other Eritreans set up the "Citizens Initiative for the Salvation of Eritrea" (CISE)

Political views 
In his Paper A Personal Observation, Tesfagiorgis explains his political views on “What Went Wrong?: The Eritrean People’s Liberation Front from Armed Opposition to State Governance”,and  democracy.

He believes that only democratically elected governments have legitimacy, because they are always accountable to the people they govern. For this reason he also abstains from violence. He joined the UK based non partisan activist group Eritrea Focus in 2018 to promote non violent transition to democratic rule. https://www.eritrea-focus.org

Exile
From his exile in London, and later in South Africa,Tesfagiorgis has been working for the advocacy organisation Justice Africa, and has spent much time working for agreement among other Eritrean dissidents on a non-violent democratic alternative for Eritrea. He also abstains from violence. In June 2015 a United Nations Commission on Human Rights of Inquiry accused President Afwerki of systematic, widespread and gross human rights violations that may constitute crimes against humanity.

Education
He has a master's degree in law from McGill University, Canada and has been a lecturer in law at the University of Asmara, Eritrea.

While he was a Faculty of Law at McGIII University, Montreal, October 1991 wrote his Thesis: "HUMAN RIGHTS, DEVELOPMENT AND NON-GOVERNMENTAL ORGANIZATIONS IN THE HORN OF AFRICA""A THESIS SUBMITTED TO THE FACULTY OF GRADUATE STUDIES AND RESEARCH IN PARTIAL FULFILLMENT OF THE REQUIAEMENTS OF THE DEGREE OF MASTER OF LAWS (LL.M.)."

Honors and awards 
Paulos Tesfagiorgis was awarded the Thorolf Rafto Memorial Prize for 2003 for his work for human rights and democracy.

References

External links
Photograph

McGill University Faculty of Law alumni
Living people
Academic staff of the University of Asmara
Year of birth missing (living people)